Merwilla plumbea is a bulb-forming perennial herb in the small genus Merwilla.

Two subspecies are recognized:
Merwilla plumbea subsp. kraussii (Baker) J.C.Manning, syn. Scilla kraussii
Merwilla plumbea subsp. plumbea, syn. Scilla natalensis

References

PlantZAfrica

Scilloideae